David Granirer is a counsellor, stand-up comic, and the author of The Happy Neurotic: How Fear and Angst can lead to Happiness and Success. He is the founder of Stand Up For Mental Health.

Granirer advocates for the de-stigmatisation of mental illness and speaks openly about his experience with depression. In his program, Stand Up For Mental Health, Granirer teaches stand-up comedy to people with mental illness as a way of increasing their self-esteem and allowing them to change their perception of their own mental health journeys. At the end of the classes, the groups perform graduation shows, where they help to reduce stigma, discrimination, and prejudice surrounding mental illness and encourage people to talk about it.  

Granirer also teaches stand-up comedy classes at Langara College in Vancouver and does Fighting Stigma in the Workplace and Laughter in the Workplace presentations.

His father and grandparents were Romanian Jews who survived concentration camps.

References

External links
 http://www.standupformentalhealth.com

People with bipolar disorder
Canadian stand-up comedians
Canadian disability rights activists
Canadian people of Romanian-Jewish descent
Jewish Canadian comedians
Living people
Langara College people
Year of birth missing (living people)